Warburton railway station was a station in the upper reaches of the Yarra Valley, 72 kilometres east of Melbourne, and the terminus of the Warburton railway line. The station opened on 13 November 1901 and closed with the line on 1 August 1965. The site is now at one end of the Lilydale to Warburton Rail Trail, which follows the route of the former railway.

On 3 May 1909, to provide better facilities for the loading of timber from the numerous mills in the area, the track was extended to La La Siding, a short distance beyond Warburton station. The extension closed with the line in 1965.

References

External links
Photo of the station and rail siding, post-1920
Photo of train entering Warburton, circa 1910
Photo of the station, circa 1910
Photo of the station and goods yard, circa 1910
Photo of the station shortly before closing, 26 November 1964
Photo of the goods shed shortly before closing, 26 November 1964
The Official website Visit Warburton - Warburton Valley Community and  Economic Development Association (CEDA)

Disused railway stations in Melbourne
Railway stations in Australia opened in 1901
Railway stations closed in 1965
1965 disestablishments in Australia
Yarra Valley